Kate Linder (born November 2, 1947) is an American actress, best known for her role as Esther Valentine on The Young and the Restless, which she has played since 1982. After appearing in the soap opera for more than 40 years, she is one of the longest serving actors on an American soap opera. Linder received a star on the Hollywood Walk of Fame in 2008, and was honored at The Hollywood Museum in 2022.

Life and career
Linder was born in Pasadena, California, and graduated with a BA in theatre arts from San Francisco State University. During that time, she also began working as a flight attendant for Transamerica Airlines. After graduation, Linder found work on television, including roles on Archie Bunker's Place and Bay City Blues.

In 1982, she was cast as Esther Valentine on the CBS soap opera The Young and the Restless.  It was originally supposed to be a one day role. Linder has been starring on The Young and the Restless for more than 40 years and is also one of two Daytime Governors at the Academy of Television Arts and Sciences, who present the Emmys. Linder is also the national spokesperson for The ALS Association and is active with TV Cares, ATAS's AIDS fundraising and awareness organization, the Make-a-Wish Foundation, and national spokesperson for March of Dimes Canada's Conductive Education Program.

For her contributions in television, Linder earned a star on the Hollywood Walk of Fame on April 10, 2008. She is the third actor to earn a star on the Walk of Fame solely on the merits of acting on a soap opera, after Jeanne Cooper in 1993 and Susan Lucci in 2005.

In the 2000s, after 30 years in daytime, Linder made her film debut, starring in a number of independent productions, such as Hysteria and Erased.  In 2016, she co-starred with Julia Roberts, Jennifer Aniston, and Kate Hudson in Garry Marshall's final film Mother's Day.

On April 30, 2018, Kate Linder appeared in a 30 minute television interview talk show with Host Ken Boxer on "Ken Boxer Live," taped in Santa Barbara, California.

In 2023, she starred in A Little White Lie, opposite Michael Shannon, Kate Hudson, Zach Braff, and Don Johnson.

In addition to her work on television, Linder serves as a flight attendant for United Airlines.

Personal life
She was married to  Dr. Ronald L. Linder for 41 years, from February 14, 1976 (Valentine's Day) until his death in 2017. She has three stepchildren from his first marriage, Jay, Jon, and Karyn.

Filmography

References

External links

KateLinder.com
Kate Linder's Myspace page

1947 births
American soap opera actresses
Living people
San Francisco State University alumni
American television actresses
20th-century American actresses
21st-century American actresses